Forbes compiles the finances of all 30 NBA teams to produce an annual ranking of the best franchises in terms of valuation. The valuations are composed of the monetary worth of the sport, market, stadium deals, and brand. These areas are supported by applying financial metrics such as debt and operating income to each one.

The latest ranking reported that the Golden State Warriors is the most valuable NBA franchise after the 2021–22 NBA season. The fastest growing NBA franchise is also the Golden State Warriors, with a 100% increase in valuation since the 2017–18 NBA season ($3.5 to $7 billion). The Warriors became the third NBA team to hold the title as the most valuable franchise since the launch of the ranking in the 1991–92 NBA season, with the other two being the Los Angeles Lakers and the New York Knicks.

Several media outlets have referenced in related news or conducts analytic journalism when the ranking comes out, such as The New York Times and Sports Illustrated. The NBA has consistently recognized the renditions of the ranking. The report has also applied more context to NBA trends, such as the financial impact of Ja Morant leveraging the Memphis Grizzlies into playoff relevancy. Financial trends in terms of 1-year increases have been more favorable for Memphis, most notably revenue after acquiring Ja Morant.

Ranking
Rankings as of October 27, 2022 (2021–22 NBA season)

Composition

Historical valuations

Notes

See also

 Forbes' list of the most valuable sports teams
 List of professional sports leagues by revenue

References

National Basketball Association teams
Basketball rankings
Top sports lists
Forbes lists